Andrew Ruhemann (born July 1962) is a film producer, director and the founder of Passion Pictures, an independent production company.

History 
Ruhemann was educated at Highgate School and studied French and Drama at Bristol University. He started his career at the Richard Williams’ Animation Studio in London in the mid 1980s, where he was a trainee producer.  Within a few months he became managing director, during which time he became responsible for overseeing animation production on the feature film Who Framed Roger Rabbit, directed by Robert Zemeckis.
 
In 2010 Andrew made his directorial debut with an animated short entitled The Lost Thing, which he co-directed with Shaun Tan, the Australian author of the book from which the film was adapted.  The Lost Thing was produced in association with Screen Australia.  The film won an Academy Award for Best Short Animation in 2011, in addition to many other awards at film festivals worldwide.

Filmography 
 A Life Less Ordinary 1997 (executive producer: animation)  
 BBC Future Generations 1998 (TV short) (animator)  
 One Day in September 1999 (documentary) (associate producer)  
 The Dog Who Was a Cat Inside 2002 (TV short) (executive producer)  
 Gorillaz: Phase One - Celebrity Take Down 2002 (video documentary) (executive producer - segment "Clint Eastwood")  
 Peace One Day 2004 (documentary) (executive producer)  
 Lila Says 2004 (executive producer)  
 City Paradise 2004 (short) (executive producer)  
 Black Sun 2005 (documentary) (executive producer)  
 Once in a Lifetime: The Extraordinary Story of the New York Cosmos 2006 (documentary) (executive producer)  
 Crossing the Line 2006 (documentary) (executive producer)  
 After the Rain 2006 (short) (executive producer)  
 My Kid Could Paint That 2007 (documentary) (co-executive producer)  
 The Adventures of One eskimO 2008 (video short) (executive producer)  
 The Flapping Track 2008 (TV documentary) (executive producer)  
 The John Akii Bua Story: An African Tragedy 2008 (documentary) (executive producer)  
 Sergio 2009 (documentary) (executive producer)  
 The Age of Stupid 2009 (documentary) (co-executive producer)  
 The Tillman Story 2010 (documentary) (executive producer)  
 Stones in Exile 2010 (documentary) (co-executive producer: Passion Pictures)  
 Fire in Babylon 2010 (documentary) (co-executive producer)  
 The Lost Thing 2010 (short) (co-director) 
 Project Nim 2011 (documentary) (executive producer)  
 How I Live Now (producer) (post-production)

References

External links 
 

1962 births
Living people
People educated at Highgate School
British film directors
Directors of Best Animated Short Academy Award winners